Héctor Carretero Milla (born 28 May 1995) is a Spanish cyclist, who currently rides for UCI ProTeam . In May 2019, he was named in the startlist for the 2019 Giro d'Italia.

Major results
2020
 1st  Mountains classification, Tirreno–Adriatico
 7th Overall Vuelta a Murcia
2021 
 1st Stage 2 Vuelta Asturias
 3rd Trofeo Serra de Tramuntana
 4th Prueba Villafranca - Ordiziako Klasika

Grand Tour general classification results timeline

References

External links

1995 births
Living people
Spanish male cyclists
Sportspeople from the Province of Albacete
Cyclists from Castilla-La Mancha